Benedita Barata da Rocha (24 February 1949 – 2 October 2021) was a Portuguese immunologist.

She earned her M.D. 1972  from the University of Lisbon, and her Ph.D. 1978  from the University of Glasgow, Scotland, UK. She was "directeur de recherche classe exceptionel" (DRCE) of the CNRS and director of a research unit of the INSERM at the Necker Institute, Paris, France. Her major scientific contributions are in the areas of T cell immune tolerance, T cell memory and development of intraepithelial lymphocytes.

In 2007 she received the CNRS Silver Medal award  and in 2009 a European Research Council advanced grant.
She published more than 100 research articles.

Major works

References

1949 births
2021 deaths
People from Lisbon
Portuguese immunologists
University of Lisbon alumni
Alumni of the University of Glasgow
Research directors of the French National Centre for Scientific Research